Berndt Stübner (16 February 1947 – 2 June 2022) was a German actor, puppet maker, playwright and theatre director.

Life and career 
From 1965 to 1969, he trained at the Deutsche Hochschule für Filmkunst Potsdam-Babelsberg. 

He played his first roles in the studio of the Hans Otto Theater Potsdam under  and then worked at the Theater Magdeburg until 1974 and in parallel at the Puppentheater. From 1974 to 1976 he was engaged at the Schauspielhaus Karl-Marx-Stadt. There he gave acting classes at the Studio Karl-Marx-Stadt. In 2017–2020 he received a guest performance contract at the Schauspielhaus Leipzig. He has also appeared in numerous radio dramas.

After 1989, he wrote and directed in collaboration with dancer Werner Stiefel for the Gewandhaus Leipzig and the University of Music and Theatre Leipzig plays and fairy tales for children, for which he also built the puppets – the plays Hansel and Gretel, Tretesel, Streitesel, Hinter der Dornenhecke, Der Fischer und seine Frau. 

Guest performances have taken him to Frankfurt, the Maxim Gorki Theater Berlin, the Schauspiel Köln and the Staatsschauspiel Dresden.

Theatre plays (selection)

Magdeburg 
 1971: Seán O'Casey: Das Ende vom Anfang (Darry) – director 
 1971: Friedrich Schiller: The Robbers (Franz Moor) – director Konrad Zschiedrich 
 1972: Friedrich Schiller: Fiesco  (Muley Hassan) – director Werner Freese
 1973: William Shakespeare: Hamlet (Hamlet) – director Werner Freese

Leipzig 
 1977: Athol Fugard: Blutsband (Morris) – director: Karl Kayser
 1978: Friedrich Schiller: Die Räuber (Karl Moor) – director: Karl Kayser
 1979: William Shakespeare: King Lear (Edgar) – director: Karl Kayser
 1979: Hans Fallada: Little Man, What Now? (Johannes Pinneberg) – director: Karl Kayser
 1981: Heinar Kipphardt:  (Dr. Marks)  – director: Hans-Michael Richter
 1982: William Shakespeare: Othello (Cassio) – director: Karl Kayser
 1983: Friedrich Schiller: Die Verschwörung des Fiesco zu Genua  (Muley Hassan) – director: Karl Kayser
 1984: Bertolt Brecht: Der kaukasische Kreidekreis (Azdak) – director: Fritz Bennewitz
 1984: Henrik Ibsen: Ghosts (Oswald) – director: Karl Kayser
 1985: Chinghiz Aitmatov: Der Tag zieht den Jahrhundertweg (Vernehmer) – director: Karl Kayser
 1986: Peter Shaffer: Amadeus (Amadeus) – director: Hans-Michael Richter
 1986: William Shakespeare: Julius Caesar (Brutus) – director: Karl Kayser
 1986: Mikhail Bulgakov: The Master and Margarita (Master) – director: Karl Kayser
 1987: Mikhail Shatrov: Diktatur des Gewissens (Goscha) – director: Karl Kayser
 1987: Michael Frayn: Der nackte Wahnsinn (Garry) – director: Klaus Fiedler
 1988: Eugène Ionesco: Rhinoceros (Behringer) – director: Hans-Michael Richter 
 1988: Dario Fo: Can't Pay? Won't Pay! (Giovanni) – director: Hella Müller
 1988: Tschingis Aitmatow:   (Funktionär /Pope) – director: Karl Kayser 
 1989: William Shakespeare: The Merchant of Venice (Bassanio) – director: Fritz Bennewitz
 1992: Gotthold Ephraim Lessing: Nathan the Wise (Nathan) – director: Lutz Graf   
 1993: Johann Wolfgang von Goethe: Iphigenie in Tauris (Thoas) – director: Lutz Graf
 1993: William Shakespeare: The Winter's Tale (King Leontes) – director: Lutz Graf
 1994: Jean Genet: The Maids (Gnädige Frau) – director: Pierre Walter Politz
 1997: Gotthold Ephraim Lessing: Minna von Barnhelm (Wirt) – director: Armin Petras
 1998: William Shakespeare: King Lear (Gloster)  (King Lear) – director: Wolfgang Engel
 1999: Ödön von Horváth:  (Rauch) – director: Michael Thalheimer
 1999: Samuel Beckett: Waiting for Godot (Estragon) – director: Herbert König
 2000: William Shakespeare: A Midsummer Night's Dream (Peter Squenz) – director: Johanna Schall
 2001: Maxim Gorki: Summerfolk (Schalimow) – director: Karin Henkel
 2001: : Republik Vineta (trainer) – director: Markus Dietz
 2002: Oscar Wilde: Salome (Jochanaan) – director: Armin Petras
 2002: Gregory Burke: Gagarin Way (Chef) – director: Thorsten Duit
 2004: Euripides: Alcestis (play) (Pheres) – director: Armin Petras
 2005: Eugene O’Neill: Ein Mond für die Beladenen (Father) – director: Boris von Poser
 2006: Elfriede Jelinek: Ein Sportstück (Trainer) – director: Volker Lösch
 2006: Christoph Hein:  (Dr. Spodek) – director: Armin Petras
 2007: Heinrich von Kleist: The Broken Jug (Dorfrichter Adam) – director: Deborah Epstein
 2007: Carl Zuckmayer: The Captain of Köpenick (Wilhelm Voigt) –  director: Tilman Gersch
 2008: Ingmar Bergman: Die Abendmahlsgäste (Pfarrer Tomas) – director:  Sebastian Hartmann
 2012: Leo Tolstoi: War and Peace (Kutusow) – director: Sebastian Hartmann
 2013: Einar Schleef: Droge Faust Parsifal (Mephisto) – director: Armin Petras
 2017: Lutz Seiler:  (Krombach) – director: Armin Petras
 2019: Hans Fallada: Jeder stirbt für sich allein (Dr. Fromm) – director: Armin Petras

Filmography 
Source:

Films 
 1967: Wedding Night in the Rain – director: Horst Seemann
 1967: Frau Venus und ihr Teufel – director: Ralf Kirsten
 1968:  – director: Horst Seemann
 1968: Hauptmann Florian von der Mühle – director: Werner W. Wallroth
 1969: Seine Hoheit – Genosse Prinz – director: Werner W. Wallroth
 1969: Zeit zu leben – director: Werner W. Wallroth
 1979:  – director: Ralf Kirsten
 1970: Weil ich dich liebe... – director: , Hans Kratzert
 2004: Nachbarinnen – director: 
 2017: Konrad und Katherina – director: Franziska Meletzky

Television 
 1969: Krause und Krupp – director: Horst E. Brandt
 1969:  – director: , Eberhard Schäfer
 1974: Der Fehltritt – director: Rolf Kabel
 1979: Der Schatz – director: Werner Freese
 1981: In der Sache Robert Oppenheimer – director: Hans-Michael Richter
 1986: Die Herausforderung – director: 
 1989:  – director: Joachim Kunert
 1992: Lessings Nathan – director: 
 2002: Abschnitt 40 – director: Florian Kern
 2002: Occupation – director: Clemens von Wedemeyer
 2006: SOKO Leipzig Schuld ohne Sühne – director: 
 2015: Mord im Rosenbeet – director: Dieter Schneider

Radio plays 
 1969: Armin Müller: Auskunft über Franziska Lesser, zwanzig (Holger) – director:  (radio play – Rundfunk der DDR)
 1977: Christopher Marlowe: Das Massaker von Paris – director:   (radio play – Rundfunk der DDR)
 1979: Hans Bach: Risse in einem gläsernen Netz (Ted Parkins) – director  (Kriminalhörspiel/Kurzhörspiel – Rundfunk der DDR)
 1980: Günter Spranger: An einem Abend im September (Cornu) – director: Annegret Berger (Kriminalhörspiel/short radio play – Rundfunk der DDR)
 1980: Karl Heinz W. Schröter: Der Fall Bielek (Ahrens) – director:  (Kriminalhörspiel/short radio play – Rundfunk der DDR)
 1985: Detlef Raupach: Bis bald, Liebster – Polterabend (Reinhardt) – director:  (short radio play – Rundfunk der DDR)
 1988: Hannelore Steiner: Blutgruppe A (Joe Blake) – director: Annegret Berger (Kriminalhörspiel/short radio play – Rundfunk der DDR)
 1988: Rita Herbst: Der Denkfehler (Harald) – director: Günter Bormann (Kriminalhörspiel/sort radio play – Rundfunk der DDR)
 1989: Klaus G. Zabel: Da Capo (Nicolas) – director: Günter Bormann (Kriminalhörspiel/short radio play – Rundfunk der DDR) 
 1990: Heinz Pelka: Die Puppe (Helwig) – director: Günter Bormann (Kriminalhörspiel/short radio play – Rundfunk der DDR)
 1990: Michael Unger: Tod in der Tiefgarage (Foreland) director: Günter Bormann (Kriminalhörspiel/short radio play – Rundfunk der DDR)
 2002: Samuel Shem: House of God (Bloom) – director:  (radio play, 5 parts – Mitteldeutscher Rundfunk)
 2004: Robert Merle: Die geschützten Männer (Mister Mills) – director:  (Science-Fiction-radio play – MDR)
 2004: Martin Andersen Nexø: Pelle the Conqueror (peasant) – director:  (radio play, 5 parts – MDR)
 2007: : Queen Mary 3 (Herr F.) – director:  (Science-Fiction-radio play – MDR)
 2007: Marina Lewycka: Kurze Geschichte des Traktors (Rechtsanwalt) – director: Oliver Sturm (radio play – MDR)
 2009: Mordecai Richler: Barneys Version (Blair) – director: Götz Fritsch (radio play – MDR)
 2009: Torsten Enders: Bachs Reiche (Friedrich August II.) – director:  (radio play – MDR)

Awards 
 1972, 1974, 1980, 1984, 1985 and 1988: 
 1979: 1. Preis für Studenteninszenierung Frau Flinz Theaterhochschule Leipzig DDR-Fernsehen
 1989: Kunstpreis der Stadt Leipzig

References

External links 
 
 

1947 births
2022 deaths
German male stage actors
German film actors
Audiobook narrators
German theatre directors
Actors from Leipzig